Derek King (born February 11, 1967)  is a Canadian former professional ice hockey left winger who currently serves as an assistant coach for the Chicago Blackhawks of the National Hockey League. King played 14 seasons in the National Hockey League from 1986–87 until 1999–2000.

Playing career
King was drafted 13th overall by the New York Islanders in the 1985 NHL Entry Draft. He played 830 career NHL games, scoring 261 goals and 351 assists for 612 points. He was a three-time 30-goal scorer, including one 40-goal season. He scored the last Maple Leafs goal in Maple Leaf Gardens in 1999.

Coaching career
On August 21, 2009, King was named the assistant coach of the Toronto Maple Leafs AHL affiliate the Toronto Marlies. In 2014, he was promoted to associate coach.

On July 28, 2015, King was named assistant coach of the Owen Sound Attack of the Ontario Hockey League. However, he left the Attack on October 28, 2015.

On July 7, 2016, King was named an assistant coach with the Rockford IceHogs of the American Hockey League, the minor league affiliate of the Chicago Blackhawks. On November 6, 2018, King was named the interim head coach of the IceHogs when head coach Jeremy Colliton was promoted to the Blackhawks. King was named the permanent head coach of the IceHogs at the end of the 2018–19 season.

On November 6, 2021, King was named interim head coach of the Chicago Blackhawks of the National Hockey League to replace the dismissed Colliton, who led the team to a 1–9–2 start to the 2021–22 season.

On November 7, 2021 King earned his first win as an NHL head coach as the Chicago Blackhawks defeated the Nashville Predators by a score of 2–1 in overtime in his head coaching debut. 

On June 27, 2022, King was replaced as head coach of the Blackhawks by former Montreal Canadiens assistant and longtime NHL defenseman Luke Richardson, but rehired 14 days later as an assistant coach.

Career statistics

Regular season and playoffs

International

NHL head coaching record

References

External links
 

1967 births
Living people
Canadian expatriate ice hockey players in Germany
Canadian ice hockey left wingers
Grand Rapids Griffins players
Hartford Whalers players
Ice hockey people from Ontario
Sportspeople from Hamilton, Ontario
München Barons players
National Hockey League first-round draft picks
New York Islanders draft picks
New York Islanders players
Oshawa Generals players
Sault Ste. Marie Greyhounds players
Springfield Indians players
St. Louis Blues players
Toronto Maple Leafs players
Canadian ice hockey coaches